Denning Township is one of twelve townships in Franklin County, Illinois, USA.  As of the 2010 census, its population was 5,202 and it contained 2,371 housing units.

Geography

Cities, towns, villages
 Freeman Spur (north half)
 Orient
 West Frankfort (west half)

Unincorporated towns
 Cambon
 Lake Creek
 Pershing
 Plumfield
(This list is based on USGS data and may include former settlements.)

Cemeteries
The township contains these four cemeteries: Denning, Follis, Hanes and Rose.

Major highways
  Interstate 57
  Illinois Route 149
  Illinois Route 37

Lakes
 Beaver Lake
 Cambon Lake

Demographics

School districts
 Frankfort Community Unit School District 168
 Herrin Community Unit School District 4
 Zeigler-Royalton Community Unit School District 188

Political districts
 Illinois' 12th congressional district
 State House District 117
 State Senate District 59

References
 
 United States Census Bureau 2007 TIGER/Line Shapefiles
 United States National Atlas

External links
 City-Data.com
 Illinois State Archives

Townships in Franklin County, Illinois
Townships in Illinois